Rokumeikan is a four-act costume drama by the Japanese writer Yukio Mishima. It was commissioned by the Bungakuza group for its 20th anniversary, and its first run was from 27 November to 9 December 1956 at the Daiichi Seimei Hall, with Haruko Sugimura playing Asako and Nobuo Nakamura playing Kageyama. The text was published in the December 1956 issue of Bungakukai.

The play was enormously successful, and toured the country. By many accounts, it was the most successful play by Mishima and has been revived on several occasions.  An English translation by Hiroaki Sato was published in 2002.

The play was adapted into different media. A film version, directed by Kon Ichikawa, appeared in 1986, and a TV version in 2008. An opera based on the play by Shin’ichirō Ikebe was premiered by the New National Theatre Tokyo in 2010.

Plot introduction
On 3 November 1886, the Emperor's birthday, a ball is to be held at the Rokumeikan, or Deer Cry Hall, in Tokyo. The guests include many foreign dignitaries. However, anti-government extremists are planning to crash the party.

Characters
Count Kageyama Hisatoshi, a ruthless figure in the government
Countess Asako, his wife
Marchioness Daitokuji Sueko, a friend of Asako
her daughter Akiko, who is in love with Hisao
Kiyohara Einosuke, leader of the dissident Liberals
his hostile son Hisao
Tobita Tenkotsu, an assassin
Kusano, a maid of the Kageyamas
General Miyamura and his wife Noriko
Baron Sakazaki and his wife Sadako
waiters and servants
numerous guests

References

Yukio Mishima. My Friend Hitler, and other plays. Translated by Hiroaki Sato. Columbia University Press, 2002.

1956 plays
Plays by Yukio Mishima
Fiction set in 1886
Plays adapted into operas